Megha means "cloud" in several Indian languages, comes from the Sanskrit word मेघ (megha, "cloud"). It may refer to:

Arts and entertainment
Megha Duta, ancient Indian poem by Kalidasa
 Megha (1996 film), an Indian Hindi-language film
 Megha (2014 film), an Indian Tamil-language film

Music
 Megha (album), a 1999 Assamese album by various artists.

People
 Megha, also known as Sumedha, a previous life of the Buddha
 Megha (singer) (born 1987), an Indian Tamil playback singer

See also
 Magha (disambiguation)
 Mega (disambiguation)
 Meghani (surname)
 Operation Meghdoot, Indian military operation